The Höhronen (1,229 m) is a mountain of the Swiss Prealps, located on the border between the Swiss cantons of Zurich and Zug. It lies approximately halfway between Lake Zurich and Lake Ägeri.

West of a secondary summit named Wildspitz (1,205 m) is located the tripoint between the cantons of Zurich, Zug and Schwyz. The tripoint, located at a height of 1,186 metres, is marked by a stone named Dreiländerstein.

References

External links

Höhronen on Hikr

Mountains of the canton of Zug
Mountains of the canton of Zürich
Mountains of the Alps
Mountains of Switzerland
One-thousanders of Switzerland
Zug–Zürich border